Anastasios "Sakis" Rouvas (born 5 January 1972), also known mononymously as Sakis, is a Greek singer, film and television actor, businessman and former pole vaulter and model. Born in Corfu, he won medals on the national athletics team during the 1980s. Rouvas began a musical career in 1991 as one of Greece's first dance-pop performers. His tenor vocals, complex choreography, costumes, and technological advancements have been credited with transforming music videos and live performances. Rouvas is noted for avoiding domestic music, attaining success for a non-laïko or -éntekhno artist, and for breaking cultural, social, artistic, and generational barriers in Greece and Cyprus.

During the early 1990s, Rouvas signed with PolyGram Records and won the Thessaloniki Song Festival. Despite five commercially successful albums, his personal life (including his military service and 1997 Greek-Turkish peace concert, which damaged his public image) has been publicized. Rouvas signed with Minos EMI in 1997, returning to the charts with Kati Apo Mena (1998) and 21os Akatallilos (2000) and ending his 14-year collaboration with manager Ilias Psinakis. One of the few Greek entertainers to gain recognition abroad, he has been popular in the Balkans since the 1990s. By the 2010s, Rouvas had expanded his career to film, television, theatre and fashion. His single "Shake It" is one of the best-selling CD singles of all time in Greece, his songs and videos, such as "1992", "Aima, Dakrya & Idrotas", "Ela Mou", "Min Antistekesai", "Xana", "Tora Arhizoun Ta Dyskola", "Den Ehei Sidera I Kardia Sou", "Ypirhes Panta", "Antexa", "Se Thelo San Trelos", "+ Se Thelo" and "Sta Kalytera Mou" have topped the popular Greek charts.

Since 2003 Rouvas has been in a relationship with model Katia Zygouli, with whom he has four children. He is involved in social issues, and has been praised for his dedication to philanthropic organizations.

Rouvas has won six Arion Music Awards, 15 Pop Corn Music Awards, 22 MAD Video Music Awards, four Status Man of the Year Awards, an MTV Europe Music Award and a World Music Award. Several number-one albums and singles which have been certified gold or higher have made him one of Greece's most popular musical artists. Known for his independence, Rouvas' musical, fashion and performance styles have influenced other artists for over two decades. In 2009 Down Town named him its "Entertainer of the Decade"; in 2010, Forbes listed him as the third-most-influential celebrity in Greece and the country's top-ranked singer.

Early life
Rouvas was born on 5 January 1972 in Mantouki, a suburb of Corfu City on the island of Corfu, the eldest of four sons of Konstantinos "Kostas" Rouvas (an ambulance driver) and the teenaged Anna-Maria Panaretou (a duty-free shop clerk at the local airport). He has three brothers: Billy (b. Vasilios, 1975), Tolis (b. Apostolos, 1977) and Nikos (b. Nikolaos, 1991). The family was poor, and Rouvas began taking care of his brothers at age five. At age four, he exhibited athletic ability and took ballet classes as a child. His parents had a theatrical background, and at age ten Rouvas starred in his first theatrical production (An I Karharies Itan Anthropi; If Sharks Were People). His older co-stars were impressed with his talent. Soon afterwards Rouvas discovered music, which he enjoyed nearly as much as athletics. He taught himself guitar, inspired by international artists such as Elvis Presley.

In 1984 his parents divorced; Rouvas and his brother Tolis moved to their paternal grandparents' home in the village of Potamos when their father remarried. The young Rouvas held a variety of jobs to support his family, including work in an automobile repair shop, as a construction worker and a bartender. Since his early childhood he had difficulty in school, particularly in reading and writing. Working during the day, Rouvas went to school at night with his mother (who had not finished secondary school).

At age 15, Rouvas joined the Greek national track and field team as an admirer of Ukrainian pole-vaulter Sergey Bubka. His vaults were consistently high—averaging —and he won a number of national awards. Rouvas continued in athletics until age 18, believing he had a future in music and joining the Corfu Band. At his graduation, he sang hits by Elvis and The Beatles.

Rouvas began performing at local clubs and hotels; at To Ekati, he was seen by future manager Ilias Psinakis. He left Corfu at age 18, moving to Patras in search of a better future.

Career

Early commercial success (1991–93)
After moving to Patras, Rouvas continued to look for performance opportunities until he met Dakis (a popular Greek artist who was the first person to help him professionally). Rouvas moved to Athens, and made his first professional appearance in 1991 at the Show Centre. His showmanship attracted the attention of music executives such as Nikos Mouratidis, who encouraged songwriter Giorgos Pavrianos to produce him. Rouvas, singing Michael Jackson's "Man in the Mirror" was discovered by PolyGram executives who signed him to his first recording contract.  Several months later he debuted at the Thessaloniki Song Festival, losing Best Vocal Performance to Giorgos Alkaios but singing the Best Composition ("Par'ta"; "Take Them", with music by Nikos Terzis and lyrics by Giorgos Pavrianos). There was a brief earthquake during the festival.

Rouvas released his eponymous debut album, which topped the Greek Albums Chart, the day after the festival. "Par'ta" became a radio hit, and other songs of the album such as "1992", "Ego S'agapo" ("I Love You") and "Gia Fantasou" ("Imagine") also became popular.

In September 1992 Rouvas released his second album, Min Andistekese (Don't Resist), also composed by Nikos Terzis. It produced the singles "Gyrna" ("Return"), "Min Andistekese", "Na Ziseis Moro Mou" ("Live, My Baby") and "Me Kommeni Tin Anasa" ("Breathless"), with a music video of the title track. The album's success helped establish Rouvas at the top of the Greek music scene.

In October 1993 Rouvas released his third album, Gia Sena (For You), with music by Alexis Papadimitriou and lyrics by Eleni Giannatsoulia and Evi Droutsa. The single "Kane Me" ("Make Me") became a radio hit, with "To Xero Eisai Moni" ("I Know You Are Alone") and "Xehase To" ("Forget It") also receiving airplay.

Aima, Dakrya & Idrotas, Tora Arhizoun Ta Dyskola, and move to Minos EMI (1994–97) 
In the winter of 1994 Rouvas collaborated with singer-songwriter and record producer Nikos Karvelas on his fourth album, Aima, Dakrya & Idrotas (Blood, tears & sweat), and its singles "Ela Mou" ("Come To Me") and "Xana" ("Again") became radio hits. Rouvas' collaboration with Karvelas was received skeptically by the media; when asked why he had chosen to collaborate with Rouvas, Karvelas said: "Sakis is the only star out of a generation which produces dull artists."

In 1996 Rouvas released his fifth studio album, Tora Arhizoun Ta Dyskola (Now the Hard Times Start), again collaborating with Nikos Karvelas and lyricist Natalia Germanou. During the winter he sang with Anna Vissi at the Chaos Club in Athens, appearing in the duet "Se Thelo, Me Theleis" ("I Want You, You Want Me", also written by Karvelas) on her 1997 album Travma (Trauma). In 1997 Rouvas and Burak Kut had recorded a duet in Greek and Turkish the previous year entitled "Birgün/Otan" ("When"), a cover of "Someday" for the Greek soundtrack of The Hunchback of Notre Dame (I Panagia Ton Parision, in which Rouvas voiced the role of Quasimodo) under the label of Minos EMI.

Kati Apo Mena, return to prominence and 21os Akatallilos (1998–2000)
In December 1998 Rouvas released his sixth album (the first with his new label): Kati Apo Mena (Something From Me), written by Giorgos Theofanous. "Den Ehi Sidera I Kardia Sou" ("Your Heart Doesn't Have Steel Rails") was a hit, and remains one of his most-popular songs. To promote the album Rouvas performed at the Virgin Megastore in Athens, where thousands of fans created a traffic jam. The next year, Rouvas records "Oso Exo Esena" ("As Long As I Have You"), a duet with singer Stelios Rokkos. The two artists work and perform together at Bio Bio in Athens during the summer.

In March 2000 Rouvas released his seventh album, 21os Akatallilos (21+ X-Rated), and performed with Katy Garbi at Pili Axiou in Thessaloniki. The album and its first single, "Andexa" ("I Held Out"), reached number one on the charts.The music video of the song , starring Miss Greece Young 1998 Vicky Bartzioka was directed by Academy Award nominee Yorgos Lanthimos

. During May rehearsals for summer performances Rouvas was hospitalized with abdominal pain, which was diagnosed as peritonitis and required an appendectomy. On 25 October 2000, he began appearing with Antonis Remos and Peggy Zina at Apollonas for the winter season. That year Rouvas became the Pepsi spokesperson for the company's Greek summer campaign making a first television ad, a first for a Greek entertainer. The Pepsi Tour 2001, of seven Greek cities, followed.

Ola Kala, international exposure and To Hrono Stamatao (2001–04)
In 2001, Rouvas signed with Universal Licensing Music (ULM) of Universal Music France after he was recommended by singer Nana Mouskouri. He collaborated with American songwriter-producer Desmond Child and Phoebus on "Disco Girl"; it was a hit in Greece and certified platinum, winning Rouvas the Pop Singer of the Year award at the inaugural Arion Music Awards. The single was later released in France, with an English version written by Andreas Carlsson. Rouvas played 20 shows across France in support of "Disco Girl", which received ample airplay, and was compared to Latin pop star Ricky Martin.

Rouvas' eighth album, Ola Kala (a collaboration with Desmond Child, Phoebus and Greek songwriters Natalia Germanou and Vangelis Konstantinidis), was released in June 2002. The album went gold in Greece within 11 days and platinum within 4 months.

In April 2003, Rouvas appeared with Antonis Remos and Nana Mouskouri at the Arion Awards. He released his ninth album, To Hrono Stamatao (I Stop Time), in December; it was certified gold after its release. Songs from the album received radio airplay, and that month Rouvas began appearing at Fever with Giorgos Tsalikis and ONE for the winter season. A Greek version of "Feelings" from the album, "Pes Tis" ("Tell Her"), was released as a single with the same video as its French- and English-language counterparts.

Eurovision and S'eho Erotefthi (2004–05)

In March 2004, Hellenic Radio and Television (ERT) announced that Rouvas would represent Greece in the Eurovision Song Contest 2004 after the selection process on the reality show EuroStar proved unsatisfactory. The show's winner was expected to represent Greece, with Nikos Terzis writing the song entry; however, ERT changed its plans when the winner's ability to perform under so much pressure was questionable and Rouvas expressed an interest in representing his country. In mid-March "Shake It", with music by Terzis and lyrics by Nektarios Tyrakis, premiered on Greek radio. Originally, the song had Latin spirit and sound but Terzis changed it, combining the Greek traditional bouzouki sound with the Latin one to make it sound different from other Latin entries of the competition. At the third Arion Music Awards, he won Best Pop Singer for To Hrono Stamatao. In mid-April "Shake It" was released as a CD single, and Rouvas began a promotional tour of Europe for the contest; To Hrono Stamatao was reissued with a bonus "Shake It" single. The song remained number one on the Greek airplay charts for several weeks, and was number one on the IFPI Greece Top 50 singles chart for nine consecutive weeks.

Rouvas was favored to win the Eurovision final. On 12 May 2004 he performed in the semi-final (appearing 10th out of 22), and performed 16th out of 24 in the 15 May 2004 final. Rouvas had two female dancers and three backing vocalists: the EuroStar winner and runners-up. Fokas Evangelinos, Rouvas' longtime choreographer, choreographed his stage show. "Shake It" finished third in the final, with Rouvas attracting great interest in the contest by Greek viewers (with a rating of 86.7 percent, the highest rating in Greek TV history at the time). Rouvas' appearance in Eurovision was a turning point in his career; his public perception changed from media-produced celebrity to notable pop artist, and he became more accessible to the media.

In June 2004, Rouvas performed "Shake It" at the first MAD Video Music Awards, where he won Sexiest Appearance for the "Pes Tis" ("Tell Her") music video. On 7 July, Rouvas performed in Istanbul with Turkish artist (and 2003 Eurovision Song Contest winner) Sertab Erener in another attempt to maintain peace between the two countries. In August he carried the Olympic torch through Panathinaiko Stadium and performed at the closing ceremony for the 2004 Summer Olympics, in which he was lowered to the stage from the air and sang a traditional Greek song, "Karapiperim".

In fall 2004, Rouvas recorded a duet version of "Se Thelo San Trelos" ("I Want You Like Crazy", from 21os Akatallilos) with Russian pop singer Philip Kirkorov. In December he began performing with Giorgos Mazonakis at Fever for the winter season, with Elena Paparizou as their opening act. His show was praised; Georgia Laimou of E-go, known for scathing reviews, wrote: "I have only good things to say about Sakis and I don't want to hear 'boo' from anyone. I don't think that a more neat, well-supported, professional, and generally flawless performance than Sakis' exists on the Athenian clubs."

On 6 April 2005 Rouvas released his tenth album, S'eho Erotefthi (I'm in Love With You), which went platinum in five months and was eventually certified 3× platinum. With Vodafone Greece as their main sponsor, release parties for the CD were held in Heraklion, Corfu, Thessaloniki, and Athens on the same day and "S'eho Erotefti", "Hilia Milia" ("A Thousand Miles"), "Mila Tis" ("Talk to Her"), "Na M' Agapas" ("You Should Love Me") and "Cairo" became radio hits. That year, Rouvas won the World Music Award as Best-Selling Greek Artist of 2004. In September he gave a charity concert at the Olympic Indoor Hall for an audience of 20,000 (the largest production by any Greek entertainer until Rouvas surpassed the record in 2009), followed by a concert in Patras.

Live Ballads, Eurovision and Iparhi Agapi Edo (2006)
On 14 February 2006, Rouvas gave a Valentine's Day concert where he sang his popular ballads and cover versions of ballads by other Greek and foreign artists. The concert was recorded, videotaped and released as Live Ballads (Rouvas' first live album and video) later in April as a CD and CD/DVD package. The CD featured three new studio tracks—"Horis Kardia" ("Without a Heart"; Greek version of Damien Rice's "The Blower's Daughter"), "Eisai Oli Mou H Zoi" and an English-language version of "S'eho Erotefthi" entitled "I'm in Love With You"—and topped the Greek album chart. On 3 April, Rouvas sang "Horis Kardia" at the Arion Music Awards, where he won Best Pop Album and Best Pop Singer for S'eho Erotefthi.

In May the Eurovision Song Contest 2006 was held in Athens, since Greece won the contest the previous year and Rouvas was asked by ERT to host the semi-final and final with Maria Menounos. At the semi-finals, Rouvas opened the show by singing the Katrina and the Waves song "Love Shine a Light" with Menounos. During the voting intermission, he performed "I'm in Love With You".

On 14 June, Rouvas performed "Agapa Me" ("Love Me"; Greek version of Julio Iglesias "Abrázame") and "Na M' Agapas" at the third MAD Video Music Awards, where he won Best Video by a Male Artist (for "Na M' Agapas") and Best-Dressed Artist in a Video (for "Mila Tis"). At the end of the summer (6 September), he collaborated with Vodafone on a beach-party concert at Yabanaki known as "Sakis on the Waves".

On 13 November he began filming his feature-film debut, in Alter Ego and on 6 December 2006 Rouvas released his eleventh studio album, Iparhi Agapi Edo (There Is Love Here). "Ego Travo Zori" (I'm Having a Hard Time") and "18 (Iprarhi Agapi Edo)" received radio airplay. The lyrics for "Mikros Titanikos (Se Latrevo)" ("Little Titanic [I Adore You]") were written by Yiannis Parios, and his son Harry Varthakouris composed the music. The album was certified platinum (selling over 40,000 copies as of April 2007).

Film and television career, This Is My Live and Irthes (2007–08)
Rouvas' Academy Awards prime-time special, Sakis Oscar Songs, aired on 20 February 2007 on Nova. The special was filmed at a private concert at Athens Arena, and featured Oscar-winning songs. In March, he began performing at Boom in Thessaloniki with Despina Vandi.

On 10 May 2007 Village Roadshow Productions' Alter Ego premiered in theatres across Greece with the avant premiere being on 7 May. With a budget of €2 million, it was one of the most expensive productions in Greece. The film received mixed reviews and sold only one-fifth of the expected number of tickets. Its 200,000 tickets made Alter Ego an average success for Greek cinema, although Rouvas was disappointed in its media coverage. The film dealt with young musicians living the rock-and-roll lifestyle (including drug abuse) facing their inner fears in the loss of a loved one. Its soundtrack was recorded by the cast of the movie and Rouvas and the theme song, "Zise Ti Zoi" ("Live Life"), reached the top 10. On 29 June 2008, Alter Ego was screened at a Los Angeles Greek festival.

On 20 July 2007, Rouvas performed in Ptolemaida, Kozani as part of the Expedition for Environment Act Now! On 10 September 2007, his concert at the Lycabettus theater as part of an OPAP campaign encouraging blood donation was recorded and was released as a CD/DVD on 12 December 2007 entitled This Is My Live. The album also featured his last single "Stous 31 Dromous" ("On 31 Roads"). On 29 October, Rouvas received his sixth Arion (Best Pop Song for "Ola Gyro Sou Gyrizoun") from five nominations, although he was absent from the ceremony.

In spring 2008, Rouvas and Antonis Remos toured North America, Australia and South Africa. Rouvas' song "+ Se Thelo" ("And I Want You") by Dimitris Kontopoulos, became a radio hit and a video with footage from the July 2008 MAD Video Music Awards, was released at the end of the year. "+ Se Thelo" became a staple of Rouvas' career. It was a critical landmark, a rare case of a Greek artist breaking generational barriers and producing a hit of that magnitude nearly two decades into their career.

In July 2008 Rouvas was announced as host for the first season of the Greek version of The X Factor, which premiered on 24 October. Rouvas was Greece's representative—singing "Stous 31 Dromous"—in the OGAE Song Contest, placing third behind Croatia and the United Kingdom.

On 3 December, Rouvas released his 12th studio album, Irthes (You Arrived), produced by Dimitris Kontopoulos. The same titled song "Irthes" was released few days earlier, on 20 November, and it was dedicated to his newborn daughter. The following day, on 4 December, he premiered his winter concert series with the Maggira Sisters at STARZ.

Eurovision, Duress, Parafora and business career (2009–2012)

ERT made an early announcement confirming that Rouvas would again be Greece's entry in the Eurovision Song Contest 2009. He performed his three songs ("Out of Control", "Right on Time" and "This Is Our Night", all composed by Dimitris Kontopoulos) at the Greek finals in February; the latter was the runaway winner with the jury and the viewers, winning 61 percent of the vote (the largest margin ever, and the most votes received by ERT in a national final). The song debuted at number one on the Greek Digital Singles chart, while Rouvas embarked on a promotional tour of Europe. He said publicly that he hoped to return the contest to Greece the following year. A win was widely anticipated by the Greek public, with the country being one of the three favorites among the Eurovision fans. However, Rouvas finished seventh in the final. The singer and the Greek public were disappointed with the result, and he issued a public apology for his loss. Rouvas received universal support from the public and the media, a first for a Greek Eurovision entrant regardless of result.

On 27 March Rouvas was appointed by ELPIDA Charity Foundation president and UNESCO Goodwill Ambassador Marianna Vardinoyannis as a "messenger" for the foundation, a charity for children with cancer, publicly recognizing his longtime behind-the-scenes support. He joined fast food chain Goody's in its ArGOODaki campaign, and donated €300,000 to the foundation in April. That month Rouvas and Zygouli introduced beauty company Mariella Nails Body and Mind Care, of which they own 25 percent.

On 1 July 2009, Rouvas performed a sold-out concert in support of environmental issues at Panathenaic Stadium before an audience of 40,000. He was one of the few musicians permitted to perform at the venue; it was the largest attendance ever at the stadium for a non-sporting event, and the largest attendance for a single musical artist in Greek history. The concert, organized by the National Youth Council, coincided with the start of the national public smoking ban. The sold-out Sakis Live Tour visited an additional 10 cities from July to September, and he performed a sold-out concert series at Politia Live Clubbing in Thessaloniki.

In October, the singer returned to host the second season of the Greek version of The X Factor and dubbed the voice of Captain Charles T. Baker in the Greek version of Planet 51. He made his American film debut in the psychological thriller Duress, with Martin Donovan. The film was screened at festivals in Poland and Russia, and was given a wide theatrical release in December by Greek distributor Hollywood Entertainment. It was expected to be released on home video in the United States.

Rouvas performed at his new S Club for the winter 2009–10 season (with Tamta, Eleftheria Eleftheriou and the American rapper Gifted) and opened sushi restaurant EDO. On 2 March 2010 the successful S Club caught fire, sustaining up to €4 million in damage. The cause of the fire was unknown, but Athens police suspected arson by rival club owners since witnesses reported seeing containers of gasoline. After repairs, Rouvas' show resumed from 19 March to 9 April and moved to Thessaloniki on 7 May for a six-week engagement at Politia Live Clubbing. He appeared on Tamta's single "Tharros I Alitheia" for her album of the same name. The song became a major club hit, and won a MAD Video Music Award for Best Duet–Collaboration Video.

Rouvas' 13th studio album, Parafora, was released on 14 December 2010 and topped the IFPI Top 75 Albums chart. It shipped 24,000 copies its first week, for a double-platinum certification. The album's first single ("Spase Ton Hrono") was Rouvas' fourth consecutive single to reach number one on all Greek charts. It won Best Balkan Song from Greece at the first Balkan Music Awards; its video gave Rouvas five MAD Video Music Awards nominations (more than any other video) and Best Pop Video, Artist of the Year and Fashion Icon of the Year awards. The song also contributed to Rouvas' MTV Europe Music Award for Best Greek Act at the MTV Europe Music Awards 2010, and he was shortlisted for the MTV Europe Music Award for Best European Act. "Emena Thes", the second single, was released in May and peaked at number five on the mixed-airplay and digital sales charts. The title track was released in October; it was number one on the domestic-airplay chart for three weeks and peaked at number two on the mixed-airplay chart. The album's fourth single, "Oi dyo mas" was released in late February 2011. Its video clip was released at the end of March, when the song topped the national-airplay chart. For the second consecutive year, Rouvas was Singer of the Year at the Status Men of the Year Awards.

In June Rouvas and his brother, Vasilis, launched TV and film production company Sakis Rouvas Kinematografos EPE, and on 14 July Rouvas ended the Greek French Embassy's Bastille Day celebration with renditions of the French and Greek national anthems. His eight-city summer tour lasted from 24 July to 19 September. At a 27 July stop in Corinth he introduced the Sakis Rouvas Collection of clothing (to which he had creative input) to Greek retailer Sprider Stores. The collection, for men and women, was launched on 16 September and available in October. Rouvas performed at the Mykonos Xlsior Festival in support of the LGBT movement on 27 August; although he was scheduled to perform at the first Εurovoice on 23 September with Enrique Iglesias, Anastacia and host Pamela Anderson, his appearance was canceled a day before the event for undisclosed reasons. For the winter season of 2010–11 Rouvas joined Anna Vissi for Face2Face, a concert series at Athens Arena beginning on 15 October. ANT1 was in negotiations with Rouvas to star in a TV series after The X Factor, and he hosted the third season of the talent show from 29 October – 11 February. For his performance, Rouvas was Presenter of the Year at the 2011 Cypriot Men of the Year Awards. On 2 February 2011 Rouvas was one of eight acts in the first MADWalk (equivalent to the international Fashion Rocks), where he represented Celia Kritharioti Haute Couture. In the spring he made ten appearances at Thalassa. After a short break Rouvas continued his live appearances at Puli Axiou in Thessaloniki, announcing his upcoming winter performances at Athens Arena with Onirama and Eleni Foureira as his opening act and releasing his new single, "Kane na mi s' agapiso". At the 2012 Johnnie Walker Men of the Year Awards in Cyprus Rouvas was presented with the Greek of the Year award for his philanthropic contributions, particularly to the Elpida Foundation. In February 2012 he performed his new single ("Bad Thing") with American singer Nomi Ruiz of Jessica 6 at the second MADWalk, where he represented designer Apostolos Mitropoulos. The single was expected to be released worldwide after the show.

In May 2012 Rouvas released a new single, "Tora" ("Νow") which he performed at the 2012 MAD Video Music Awards. In November, he released a rock-Zeibekiko mash-up ballad entitled "Niose Ti Thelo" ("Feel What I Want"). Rouvas was nominated for four Mad Video Music Awards (including Best Pop Video and Video of the Year), winning Male Artist of the Year and Artist of the Year for "I Dyo Mas".

Theatre, Chevalier and Mia Hara Na Pernas (2013–2020) 
Rouvas returned to television as a presenter for ANT1's Iroes Anamesa Mas (Heroes Among Us), a ten-part documentary series focusing on stories of people who have been commended for heroic deeds which premiered on 24 May 2013. For the series, Rouvas traveled throughout Greece interviewing the featured nominees. During the summer, he made his theatrical debut in Euripides' tragedy The Bacchae in the lead role of Dionysus, for which he was awarded with the best performance award by the 2014 Greek Theatre Critics Awards in the category of ancient drama.

Working again with songwriter Theofanous, in May 2013 Rouvas released a ballad single ("Mia Hara Na Pernas"; "Have A Good Time"). At the 2013 MAD Video Music Awards, he was nominated for four awards: Best Pop Video, Video of the Year, Male Artist of the Year and Artist of the Year. "Tora" was nominated for most-played radio song of the year, and as part of the awards' tenth anniversary Rouvas' 2008 live performance of "+ Se Thelo" was nominated for best live performance in the show's history.

On 24 November 2013 Rouvas was among a group from the Ionian Islands who were commended by the Hellenic Union of Eptanisians (Ionians) for their work and philanthropy. To honor the winners, the organization released a collectors'-edition philatelic envelope with a stamp bearing a picture of the group.

In January 2014, continuing his support for the Elpida Foundation in practice, Rouvas became the first volunteer bone-marrow donor at the Orama Elpidas (Vision of Hope) marrow bank, and he is appearing in a foundation campaign encouraging marrow donation. His "Ace of Hearts Tour" that started on 26 April 2014, was dedicated to the Elpida Foundation and the Orama Elpidas marrow bank. The final concert of the tour took place in Athens on 11 October 2014.

On 13 January 2014, it was announced that Rouvas would be part of Athina Tsaggari's new feature film named "Chevalier", where he would be one of the protagonists of the movie. The shootings of the movie started on January and are set to be done in March 2014.

On 11 March 2014, Rouvas himself uploaded a promo video of his new single "Se Pethimisa" (I Missed You) on his YouTube channel that will be released later during the year. For this song, Rouvas continues his cooperation with the songwriter Theofanous, while the lyrics belong to Thanos Papanikolaou.

After his success as Dionysus in The Bacchae, Rouvas' next theatrical step includes a musical. In September 2014, it was announced that Rouvas would be part of the musical "Hraklis; Oi dodeka athloi" (Hercules; The twelve labours) at the role of Hercules. The premiere took place on 12 December 2014. In 2015 he performed Mikis Theodorakis's Axion Asti.

In 2016 Chevalier, was selected as the Greek entry for the Best Foreign Language Film at the 89th Academy Awards. Since 2016, Rouvas has been a coach on The Voice Greece.

Rouvas performed in Estate Club for the 2018-2019 and 2019-2020 seasons (with Stelios Rokkos and Helena Paparizou (2019-2020)). He and Rokkos collaborated in the single "Ta Zorikia Vradia" in 2018. Rouvas single "Ela Sto Horo" was released in 2019. In September 2019 he gave a concert along with Helena Paparizou and Eleni Foureira. He and Paparizou later in 2020 released a single called "Etsi einai i Fasi".

In August 2020 he performed in Odeon of Herodes Atticus along with soprano Sonia Theodoridou.

Sta Kalytera Mou, Idols and current projects (2021–current) 

In spring 2021 Sakis Rouvas released his new 14th album, titled "Sta Kalytera Mou" and produced by Phoebus. Lead single was titled Yperanthropos. The album reached number one on the IFPI Greece top 75 albums sales chart for several consecutive weeks, and was the Greek best-selling album of 2021 in Greece. He also took part in the collaborative album "O Prigkipas tis Dytikis Ochthis", which was released in the memory of the singer-songwriter Manos Xydous, a member of the Greek rock band Pyx Lax. The album ended the third best selling greek language album of 2021.

In late 2021 he presented the television documentary series "Idols", dedicated to personalities who stigmatized Greece's popular culture with their professional course and life. Aliki Vougiouklaki, Malvina Karali, Nikos Kourkoulos, Dimitris Mitropanos, Vlassis Bonatsos lives were featured.

Artistry

Influences

Elvis Presley was Rouvas' musical idol; he also enjoyed The Beatles, The Rolling Stones, Kiss and Queen. Although he was influenced most by 1960s music, he also likes George Michael and Michael Bolton. The singer considers Queen's "Bohemian Rhapsody" "one of the ten best songs that have ever been written." Similarities between Presley and Rouvas have been noted; during his STARZ performances, the Maggira Sisters' opening sketch was based on Presley's concern about a popular Greek singer who imitated him. Rouvas covered Presley's "Suspicious Minds" for the Alter Ego soundtrack, and has said that what impressed him most as a child about Presley was "the way that he sang, that he danced, that he felt what he interpreted and what I believed that his audience felt when they heard him". He has also been influenced by Greek artists such as Giannis Parios, Marinella and Nana Mouskouri (his mentor), and considers Haris Alexiou and Anna Vissi as the two greatest Greek female artists.

Michael Jackson's "Earth Song" is a favourite of Rouvas' for its environmental message; after Jackson's death, he dedicated a song to the American singer at his Concert for the Environment and spoke about Jackson's legacy:

"[Michael Jackson was] one of the most significant singers ever on this planet and the biggest showman that has ever passed by on this planet [...] a person whose life was a 'thriller', but however complicated his life was, he dedicated it for the good of the children and of the planet. Many people want to remember him for the complex persona that he had, I want to remember him for everything that he gave to us all of these years, and for all the reasons that he inspired us."

Musicianship

Rouvas is fluent in Greek, English and French, presenting the Eurovision Song Contest 2006 in all three languages. He has also recorded songs in all three languages, singing phonetically in Turkish and Russian for his 1997 collaboration with Burak Kut in Cyprus and the Russian duet version of "Se Thelo San Trelos" ("Kak Sumashedshij Ya") with Philipp Kirkorov; one of three versions, it was a Russian hit. Rouvas plays guitar, bass, piano, cello and some percussion. On some tours he plays his black Gibson Les Paul electric guitar, switching to acoustic guitar for unplugged performances such as Live Ballads.

Rouvas has expressed disappointment with the ignorance of youthful audiences of older music. He considers himself a pop-rock artist, although he has described his musical style as "always more rock" than he has been credited. Rouvas has been praised for not tapping into traditional Greek music for commercial success, since pop music is a niche genre in Greece. Asked if he thought it difficult being a pop-rock artist in a folk market, he replied that there was a need for a variety of genres; while he has experimented with traditional Greek music, it is not what he feels he does best.

Vocal style
Rouvas had no vocal lessons as a boy and taught himself primarily by ear, so during the recording of his first album he had to learn music theory in a short time. His voice developed significantly since his early teenaged performances. Rouvas' detractors have criticized his voice as average, or limited, contending that his appeal is based on image. Whatever the assessment of his voice, it has often been overshadowed by showmanship and appearance in the media; many preferred to watch him perform than to listen to him. These criticisms diminished by the second decade of Rouvas' career; his technical skills (range, power and versatility in particular) and expression are better appreciated.

Rouvas has a tenor vocal range; although he can also sing low, in the F-clef range, he prefers to sing higher and can reach notes beyond the typical tenor high without falsetto, varying his dynamics from whispers to belts. His vocal power was evident in early recordings, notably on "Mia Fora" from Aima, Dakrya & Idrotas (the first album to showcase his vocal ability). During his 1997–98 hiatus, Rouvas received voice lessons from American coach Raz Kennedy focusing on rock and blues techniques. His subsequent sixth album, Kati Apo Mena, was a milestone in Rouvas' vocal development; he exhibited a consistent depth and dimension which previously appeared only sporadically on his first five albums. He won the Pop Corn Music Award for Best Male Vocal Performance twice in a row: for 1999's "Den Ehei Sidera I Kardia Sou" and 2000's "Se Thelo San Trelos" (the latter from 21os Akatallilos). By Live Ballads in 2006, Pavlos Zervas of Music Corner considered that Rouvas' voice had reached its most-mature form.

Critic Tasos P. Karantis of Orfeas conceded that Rouvas sang with competence and technical precision, and his voice was easily recognizable. Ilias Malasidis of Athens 24 noted that Rouvas' voice was initially more intriguing than his material. His voice is best-suited to power ballads, his signature style due to his sensual tone. Reviewers have praised Rouvas' live performances, particularly his ability to execute "especially difficult and demanding songs", hold long, high notes and dance while singing. Down Town commended him for never using a playback track, common among Greek artists, but Billboard noted that an ability to sing well in English would increase his international appeal. During his career, Rouvas has perform in a number of genres, contemporary and traditional; in some songs (such as "O Iroas" from Iparhi Agapi Edo), he delivers spoken verses which have been described as a "light rap." He has also performed as a crooner styles and a classical tenor. Rouvas' defining characteristic as a vocalist has been his emotional expression. He maintains his voice with a strict organic food diet and avoiding alcohol and smoking, banning smoking in his dressing room. Singer-songwriter Stelios Rokkos, who collaborated with him for three seasons, described him as "probably the most disciplined singer I have ever met—in fact, to the point of insanity."

Live shows and music videos

Film and television

After his 2005 move to Los Angeles Rouvas studied acting and received some training from his friend, Tom Hanks. He was interested in film since childhood, and a year and a half later he received an offer from Village Roadshow. In Rouvas' first feature film, Alter Ego (of which he was also associate producer), he played a role similar to himself. Before that, he dubbed English-language animated films in Greek. When comparisons between Rouvas and the character Stefanos in Alter Ego arose (with speculation that the character was autobiographical), he replied that despite similarities Stefanos was a "much more aggressive person." Rouvas adopted a new look for the film, credited by Nitro as reflecting the emo movement emerging among Greek youth. While Rouvas was attracted some critical praise for his foray into acting, others felt that it was too early to evaluate his acting talent.

Rouvas' second film (the indie Duress) was a Hollywood psychological thriller in which he played a serial killer, against type for Greek audiences, and said the film was the most difficult thing he had done in his career until that point. Giannis Zoumboulakis of To Vima found Rouvas convincing in the film's cat-and-mouse plot: "You accept the proposal from the first moments, forgetting completely that the 'bad' guy in the story is the host of X-Factor", concluding that "Going against his own image, Rouvas creates a very exceptional psycho killer. With his gray-beige, old wool coat and grimy, parted hair and without his bright smile he creates from scratch a hero that is all his." Panagiotis Timogiannakis contended that Rouvas began showing a different side of himself in Alter Ego, noting that the lighting in both films did not flatter him. Timogiannakis wondered if Rouvas had deglamourized himself to receive serious roles: "He needs to clear up whether he wants to have a career of a star or of a role player. A born role player he does not seem to be. A born star he is."

The 2006 Eurovision Song Contest was a springboard for glib host roles, such as for The X Factor. Producer Giannis Latsios said that Rouvas' presence contributed significantly to the show's success, calling his first-season performance "great" and adding: "We had a program that had to do with music and Sakis, on a collective level, is an icon that the generation which participates in this show has as an idol. He is a glowing character with much higher capabilities of expression and, if he decides to continue this path, will improve. He has immediacy, critique and most of all he gave to a program a luster, which was not standard from the beginning."

Personal life 
After moving to Athens he lived with an older English woman named Sally, with whom he had begun a relationship on Corfu. Their relationship ended when Psinakis became Rouvas' manager, and the singer became more career-oriented. The media has speculated about Rouvas' personal life and relationships with model Zeta Logotheti, Sofi Kantarou (a Corfu bar manager) and singer Elli Kokkinou. At this time, Rouvas became more reclusive and guarded about his personal life.

In 2003 he was in a relationship with the London based Taiwanese producer Rebecca Wang.

Rouvas met model Katia Zygouli back in 2003 during the shootings of a commercial ad for Vodafone and the two of them became a couple. They kept their relationship away from the media despite the rumors and Rouvas first confirmed their relationship during a radio interview to Natalia Germanou.

In June 2008, Rouvas announced Zygouli's pregnancy and on 2 November 2008, Zygouli gave birth to the couple's first child, a daughter named Anastasia after her father on 18 October 2009. Her godmother was Emmanouela Pavlatou, a friend of Melina Mercouri, and the baptismal date was chosen to coincide with Mercouri's birthday. Anastasia's birth was extensively covered by the media. On 15 October 2011, Rouvas and Zygouli became parents for the second time to a son, named Alexandros. The couple's third child and second daughter, named Ariadni, arrived on 3 January 2013. The couple welcomed their fourth child, on 21 April 2016. On Monday 3 July 2017, Sakis Rouvas married Katia Zygouli.

Political causes 

In July 2015 Rouvas uploaded a video message titled "Yes we are Europe" on his personal YouTube channel, in which he supported the pro-Europe vote for the 2015 Greek bailout referendum.

On Twitter, he follows the accounts of politicians across the board from far-left to far-right, and party leaders Alexis Tsipras and Antonis Samaras, to have a full picture of what they are saying and how political leaders are confronting each other. He also followed a Golden Dawn MP at some point. This led him to be referenced by a Syriza MP, Pavlos Polakis, in a speech in the Greek Parliament, suggesting that he had supported the party. Rouvas sent a Cease and desist letter to Polakis asking to retract his statement or the matter would be dealt with in court.

Controversies 
When he was called for military service in 1994 he asked for a delay, since his service would coincide with the release of Aima, Dakrya & Idrotas; the request was denied, although other artists had been able to delay their service for career reasons. Although it was initially thought that Rouvas did not want to leave the spotlight when his career was growing, he claimed his reluctance to serve was due to agoraphobia. His claims were met with astonishment; media outlets remarked that agoraphobia was an odd condition for an entertainer, and critics accused him of draft dodging. The singer was taken to the Penteli psychiatric hospital for an evaluation, and it was widely reported that he had attempted suicide. After his release Rouvas fulfilled his military service. During his service, he was pestered by paparazzi. Psinakis accused Rouvas' psychiatrist of pouring psychotropic drugs into Rouvas' alcoholic beverages because of a previous quarrel. When asked if he was suicidal Rouvas said he did not think so, but he was so drugged at the time of the emergency call that he did not recall the exact events; he confirmed that he tried to desert by climbing under a Jeep and attaching himself to its undercarriage.

On 19 May 1997, Rouvas performed with Turkish singer Burak Kut at a bi-national reconciliation concert on the Green Line in Cyprus before an audience of over 4,000. The concert received international coverage and support, earning Rouvas an International Abdi Ipekçi Prize for global understanding and co-operation; however, the concert was controversial to Greek and Turkish protesters, and stones, eggs and tomatoes were thrown at the singer in all his next concerts. Opposition to the concert turned the Greek and Greek-Cypriot media against Rouvas, and was fodder for tabloid talk shows in Greece. Rouvas left Greece and moved to the United States for six months for the incident to be forgotten.

During summer 2000 Rouvas, Psinakis and a number of other celebrities visited Mykonos on a yacht borrowed from a local physician. They were accused of drug possession, since the yacht contained narcotics. Although the doctor admitted that the narcotics were his, his guests were questioned. However, thousands of T-shirts were printed which read: "Imoun ki ego sto kotero!" ("I was on the yacht, too!").

He collaborated with Pepsi in 2001, the advertisement, featuring a semi-nude Rouvas holding a Pepsi bottle in front of his genitals, was controversial among women's rights and parental associations. Calling it "unsightly, vulgar and unacceptable", they tried to have the ad blocked as "disgrac[ing] childhood innocence and dignity."

Discography

Studio albums
Sakis Rouvas (1991)
Min Andistekese (1992)
Gia Sena (1993)
Aima, Dakrya & Idrotas (1994)
Tora Arhizoun Ta Dyskola (1996)
Kati Apo Mena (1998)
21os Akatallilos (2000)
Ola Kala (2002)
To Hrono Stamatao (2003)
S'eho Erotefthi (2005)
Iparhi Agapi Edo (2006)
Irthes (2008)
Parafora (2010)
 Sta Kalytera Mou (2021)

Live albums
Live Ballads (2006)
This Is My Live (2007)

Filmography

Tours and residencies

Concert tours
Tora Arhizoun Ta Dyskola Summer Tour (1997)
Pepsi Tour (2001)
Ola Kala World Tour (2002)
Sakis Live in Town Tour (2003)
Sakis on Stage Tour (2005)
Fire Victims Tour (2007)
Antonis Remos – Sakis Rouvas World Tour (2008) 
Kalokairino Randevou me ton Saki Tour (2008)
Sakis Live Tour (2009)
Sakis Summer Tour 2010

Concert residencies

To Ekati (1990)
Athens Show Center (1991)
Posidonio (1992)
Posidonio (1994)
Chaos (1996)
Pyli Axiou (1997)
Chaos (1998)
Vio Vio (1999–2000)
Pyli Axiou (2000)
Apollonas (2000–01)
Rex (2001–2002)
Fever (2003–04)
Fever (2004–05)
Boom (2007)
Politia (2008)
STARZ (2008–09)
Politia Live Clubbing (2009)
The S Club (2009–2010)
Politia Live Clubbing (2010)
Face2Face (2010–11)
The S Club at Thalassa: People's Stage (2011)
Pyli Axiou (2011)
Underworld S Club (2011–2012)
Underworld S Club at Politia Live Clubbing (2012)
The S Club at Thalassa: People's Stage (2012)

Awards

Bibliography
 "Afti Einai I Zoi Mou" (2009); An article co-written with Petros Kostopoulos featured in the April 2009 issue of Nitro.
 "Info-diet 370" (2011); An article featured in the November 2011 issue of Athens Voice.

See also

Honorific nicknames in popular music
List of Eurovision Song Contest presenters
List of Greeks
List of Pepsi spokespersons
Mononymous person

Notes

Further reading

External links

 SakisRouvas.com - Official website
 
 
 
 Sakis Rouvas on Spotify

! colspan="3" style="border-top: #DAA520 5px solid;" | Eurovision Song Contest

! colspan="3" style="border-top: #DAA520 5px solid;" | World Music Awards

! colspan="3" style="border-top: #DAA520 5px solid;" |  Other

 
1972 births
20th-century Greek male actors
21st-century Greek male actors
Actors from Corfu
Arion Music Awards winners
Eastern Orthodox Christians from Greece
English-language singers from Greece
Greek environmentalists
Eurovision Song Contest entrants of 2004
Eurovision Song Contest entrants of 2009
Greek businesspeople
Greek dance musicians
Greek male dancers
Eurovision Song Contest entrants for Greece
Greek expatriates in the United States
Greek fashion designers
Greek male film actors
Greek film producers
Greek male models
20th-century Greek male singers
Greek philanthropists
Greek pianists
Greek pop singers
Greek rhythm and blues singers
Greek rock guitarists
Greek rock singers
Greek singer-songwriters
Greek television presenters
Greek male voice actors
Greek health activists
Humanitarians
Living people
MAD Video Music Awards winners
Minos EMI artists
21st-century Greek male singers
Musicians from Corfu
Nightclub owners
PolyGram Records (Greece) artists
Restaurateurs
Rock pianists
Sportspeople from Corfu
Thessaloniki Song Festival winners
World Music Awards winners
Greek laïko singers
Male pianists
MTV Europe Music Award winners